Geoffrey Kirkland (born 1939) is an English production designer. He was nominated for an Academy Award in the category Best Art Direction for the film The Right Stuff. He is also a two-time BAFTA winner for his work in Bugsy Malone and Children of Men. He was also nominated for a Primetime Emmy for his work in Hemingway & Gellhorn.

Selected filmography
 Bugsy Malone (1976)
 Midnight Express (1978)
 Fame (1980)
 WarGames (1983)
 The Right Stuff (1983)
 Children of Men (2006)
 Hemingway & Gellhorn (2012)

References

External links

1939 births
Living people
British film designers
English designers
Best Production Design BAFTA Award winners